Tauno Tiusanen (born 30 April 1941, in Helsinki, Finland) is a professor emeritus of University of Glasgow and Lappeenranta University of Technology (Finland).

He held the professorship of economics and worked as Director of the Institute of Russian and East European Studies at the University of Glasgow to 1995. He also acted as editor-in-chief of the Europe-Asia Studies.

References

Academics of the University of Glasgow
1941 births
Living people
Academic staff of Lappeenranta University of Technology